Teminabuan is a small town in South Sorong Regency, Southwest Papua, Indonesia. The town serves as the administrative capital of South Sorong Regency. It had a population of 11,627 at the 2010 Census and 19,491 at the 2020 Census. The town is located in the southwestern-central part of the Bird's Head Peninsula. The area was bombed between January and March 1967.(by whom?) It is served by Teminabuan Airport.

Notable people 

 Marlina Flassy - anthropologist and Dean of the Faculty of Social and Political Sciences at Cenderawasih University.
Raja Kaibus, Anggok Kondjol - slaver king, ruler of weri Ambuam which became Teminabuan

References

Populated places in Southwest Papua
Regency seats of Southwest Papua